Dato' Dr. Mah Hang Soon (Bàng-uâ-cê: Mā Háng-sông; ; born 19 July 1965) is a Malaysian politician who served as Deputy Minister of Education I for the second term in the Barisan Nasional (BN) administration under former Prime Minister Ismail Sabri Yaakob and former Minister Radzi Jidin from August 2021 to the collapse of the BN administration in November 2022 and the first term in the Perikatan Nasional (PN) administration under former Prime Minister Muhyiddin Yassin and Minister Radzi Jidin from March 2020 to the collapse of PN administration in August 2021, Senator from March 2020 to his resignation in November 2022. Member of the Perak State Legislative Assembly (MLA) for Chenderiang from March 2008 to May 2018. He has served as Deputy President of the Malaysian Chinese Association (MCA) since November 2018, a component party of the BN coalition.

Background
Mah is a cardiologist and graduate of the University of Malaya. He has been involved in full-time politics since 2008.

Originally from Kampung Baru Changkat Kruing, Ayer Tawar, Perak Darul Ridzuan. He is the eldest of six siblings. His father's name was Mah Chow Nam (1944–2014), whilst his mother was Lee Kee Hiong (1942–), were smallholders of rubber and oil palm. He married Lim Soo Lee and had a son named Mah Song Wei (1996–).

Malaysian Chinese Association (MCA)
He is the current deputy president of MCA. He was previously the National MCA Youth Vice President and the Perak MCA Youth Chief in 2008–2010. From 2013 until now, he is the Chairman of the MCA Perak and the Central Council (CC).

Political career
In the 11th Malaysian general election, Dr. Mah made his debut and contested the Jelapang state seat in the Perak State Legislative Assembly. He failed to win the seat by 7,981 votes compared to Hee Yit Foong, a Democratic Action Party (DAP) candidate who gained 8,233 votes.

In the 12th Malaysian general election, he won the state assembly state seat for Chenderiang with a majority of 3,392 votes and retained it in the 13th Malaysian general election with a majority of 4,767 votes.

During his two terms as Perak State Assemblyman, Dr. Mah has served in the Perak State Executive Council as the Chairman of the Health, Local Government, Consumer Affairs, Environment, Transportation and Non-Muslim Affairs (2009–2013); and Chairman of the Committee on Health, Public Transportation, Non-Islamic Affairs, National Integration and New Villages (2014–2018).

Dr. Mah was picked as the BN candidate to contest the Tanjong Malim parliamentary seat instead in the 14th Malaysian general election (GE14) even though his candidacy received protest from incumbent Ong Ka Chuan's party supporters who had protested in front of the Bangunan Perdana, Putrajaya prior to the nomination day. He however lost to the People's Justice Party (PKR) candidate Chang Lih Kang. The total number of votes he received was 19,314 while the PKR candidate received 24,672 votes with a majority of 5,358 votes. Overall, BN lost the parliamentary majority and failed to form the Federal Government in the GE14.

Election results

Honours
  :
  Knight Commander of the Order of the Perak State Crown (DPMP) – Dato’ (2009)

External links

References

1965 births
Living people
People from Perak
Malaysian people of Chinese descent
Malaysian cardiologists
Malaysian Chinese Association politicians
Members of the Dewan Negara
Members of the Perak State Legislative Assembly
Perak state executive councillors
University of Malaya alumni
21st-century Malaysian politicians